J. Kevin McMahon  is president and CEO of the Pittsburgh Cultural Trust, a $50 million private, nonprofit agency in Pittsburgh, Pennsylvania.

The trust, established in 1984, promotes the cultural and economic growth of downtown Pittsburgh through the development of a fourteen-block arts and entertainment center in downtown Pittsburgh—the Cultural District. He is its second president, following Carol Brown, who retired in 2000.

Prior to his current role he was a development officer from 1983 to 1992 for The New School in New York City and executive vice president of the Kennedy Center in Washington, D.C. from 1992 to 2001.

He also teaches as an Adjunct Professor for the Heinz College at Carnegie Mellon University.

McMahon holds an MBA from the City University of New York and an undergraduate degree in economics and psychology from Hiram College.

References
Marylynne Pitz (2005). Pittsburgh Post-Gazette: Profile of J. Kevin McMahon. Retrieved May 22, 2006.

External links
 Pittsburgh Cultural District website
 Pittsburgh Cultural Trust website

Hiram College alumni
Living people
People from Pittsburgh
Baruch College alumni
Carnegie Mellon University faculty
Year of birth missing (living people)